Armando is a masculine given name. It is a variant of the name Herman. Notable people bearing the name include:

 Armando Allen (born 1989), American football player
 Armando Álvarez (born 1970), Spanish footballer
 Armando Bandini (1926–2011), Italian actor
 Armando Becker (born 1966), Venezuelan basketball player
 Armando Colombo, German engineer
 Armando Dobra (born 2001), Albanian footballer
 Armando Estrada (born 1978), ring name for American professional wrestler and manager, Hazem Ali
 Armando Gallop (1970–1996), American acid house musician
 Armando Guevara (born 1955), Venezuelan boxer
 Armando Herrera (born 1955), Cuban triple jumper
 Armando Iannucci (born 1963), Scottish radio and television presenter and satirist
 Armando Lambruschini (1924–2004), Argentine admiral
 Armando Manzanero  (1935–2020), Mexican Mayan musician, singer, composer
 Diego Armando Maradona (1960-2020), Argentine football player, coach and manager
 Armando Monteiro (disambiguation), several people
 Pitbull (rapper) (born 1981), stage name of Armando Christian Pérez
Armando Palacio Valdés, Spanish writer
Armando Pombeiro, Portuguese chemical engineer
 Armando Ribeiro (born 1971), Spanish football goalkeeper
 Armando Stettner, computer engineer

See also 
 Armando (disambiguation)

References 

Spanish masculine given names
Italian masculine given names